Lego Avatar: The Last Airbender was a Lego theme based on the Nickelodeon television show Avatar: The Last Airbender. It is licensed from Nickelodeon. The theme was first introduced in June 2006. It was eventually discontinued by the end of 2007.

Overview
Lego Avatar: The Last Airbender was based on Book One of Avatar. The product line focuses on the journey of twelve-year-old Aang, the current Avatar and last survivor of his nation, the Air Nomads, along with his friends Katara and Sokka, as they strive to end the Fire Nation's war against the other nations of the world. Lego Avatar: The Last Airbender aimed to recreate the main characters in Lego form, including Aang, Katara, Sokka, Momo, Zuko, Firebender and Fire Nation soldier.

Initially, the Nickelodeon featured Lego sets did not only release the two Lego Avatar: The Last Airbender sets. Three Lego SpongeBob SquarePants sets were released at the same time in 2006, both being the flagship product for a newly signed partnership of Lego and Nickelodeon. The Nickelodeon series featured its most iconic shows, which were Avatar, SpongeBob SquarePants and its newest member, Teenage Mutant Ninja Turtles. The Lego Avatar: The Last Airbender sets were not a series of their own, but only a theme out of many of the main series which was Nickelodeon.

Characters
 Aang: The last surviving Airbender, a monk of the Air Nomads' Southern Air Temple.
 Sokka: A fifteen-year-old Sokka is a warrior of the Southern Water Tribe, a nation where some people are able to telekinetically manipulate, or "bend", water.
 Katara: A fourteen-year-old waterbender (i.e., she has the ability to telekinetically control water and ice); at the beginning of the story, she is the only waterbender in the Southern Water Tribe, one of three known communities in which waterbending is practiced.
 Momo: A winged Lemur was introduced when Aang finds him at the Southern Air Temple and then keeps him as a pet.
 Zuko: The Crown Prince of the Fire Nation and a skilled firebender, meaning he has the ability to create and control fire.

Construction sets
According to Bricklink, The Lego Group released a total of 2 Lego sets as part of Lego Avatar: The Last Airbender theme. It was discontinued by the end of 2007.

In 2006, The Lego Group announced a partnership with Nickelodeon. It was officially announced by The Lego Group that the two sets based on Book One of Avatar was released on 1 June 2006. The two sets being released were Air Temple (set number: 3828) and Fire Nation Ship (set number: 3829).

Air Temple
Air Temple (set number: 3828) was released on 1 June 2006 based on the seventeenth episode of Book I: Water The Northern Air Temple. The set consists of 400 pieces with 5 minifigures. The set included a section of the Northern Air Temple and Aang's glider. The Northern Air Temple included a main door with sliding and locking features. Also included a catapult and Fire Nation vehicle that is able to seat with one minifigure. The set included Lego minifigures of the Aang, Sokka, Momo,  Firebender and Fire Nation soldier.

Fire Nation Ship
Fire Nation Ship (set number: 3829) was released on 1 June 2006 and based on Prince Zuko's ship. The set consists of 722 pieces with 5 minifigures. The set features a largest Fire Nation ship, a built in catapult, a small dinghy that could launch out of the main ship and seat with one minifigure, a retractable anchor and extending ladder along the side of the ship. The set included Lego minifigures of the Aang, Katara, Zuko, Firebender and Fire Nation soldier.

Other media

Lego Ideas
In 2020, a revival set named Avatar: The Last Airbender – The Avatar Returns and it was created by StudioTRico reached 10,000 votes on LEGO Ideas in order for Lego to consider to make it into an official set. The project is based on Avatar: The Last Airbender – The Avatar Returns from the original Lego Avatar: The Last Airbender theme and includes characters such as Aang, Katara, Sokka, Prince Zuko, Iroh and a Fire Nation soldier.

See also 
 Lego SpongeBob SquarePants
 Lego Teenage Mutant Ninja Turtles

References 

Avatar: The Last Airbender
Products introduced in 2006
Products and services discontinued in 2007
Avatar